Sagit Agish (1904–1973) was a Bashkir poet, writer and playwright.

Early life
Sagit Agish was born as Sagit Ishmukhametovich Agishev on 19 January 1905 in the village of Isangildy, Sharlyksky District, Orenburg province. He was attended Khusaniya School. He later studied at the Orenburg Bashkir Pedagogical College and the Bashkir State Pedagogical Institute.

Literary career
Agish began writing in the 1930s. He started by writing prose. His earliest stories, “Makhmutov” (1939), “Guys” (1939), and “In Mazin’s House” (1940) portrayed life in the Soviet Union in the 1930s.

Books
Agish wrote frequently about the Soviet Union. His books Ilmurza, A Horseman (1942), Akhmadulla (1944), To the Front (1944) and My Three Months (1944) are about tales of patriotism in the Soviet Union. He wrote one novel, Foundation (1951), on Bashkir village life. His other notable books include Selected Stories (1953), Two Dawns (1961), By the River (1961), On the Way (1967) and Gnedko (1972).

References

1904 births
1973 deaths
Soviet writers
Socialist realism writers
Bashkir writers
Bashkir-language poets